"Long Haired Country Boy", is a song written and performed by the Charlie Daniels Band and released on their 1974 album Fire on the Mountain. It was first released as a single in April, 1975 and was re-released as a single in January, 1980. In 2019, it was covered by Cody Johnson on his album, Ain't Nothin' to It.

Cash Box said "fine lyrics and musicianship adds up to another potential smash."

Chart performance

References

External links
 

1975 songs
1975 singles
1980 singles
Charlie Daniels songs
Songs written by Charlie Daniels
Epic Records singles
Country rock songs
Southern rock songs